"Further Up (Na, Na, Na, Na, Na)" is a song by Israeli musical duo Static & Ben El, and American rapper Pitbull. The single was released on January 10, 2020, by Saban Music Group.

Background 
The single is the follow-up English record by Static & Ben El, after "Tudo Bom" featuring Colombian reggaeton artist J Balvin. It includes a sample from Jamaican reggae artist Ini Kamoze's 1994 hit, "Here Comes the Hotstepper". Pitbull would go on to work with Saban Music Group again for his own charity single, titled "I Believe That We Will Win (World Anthem)", in which all proceeds from song sales, streaming and views are being donated to Feeding America and the Anthony Robbins Foundation.

Music video 
The video was released alongside the single on January 10, 2020 through Static & Ben El's official YouTube channel. It produced by ROMS Studios and surpassed six million views on YouTube in less than a week. The video has garnered over 29 million views as of May 2020. In addition, animated lyric videos for both the original and Spanish version of the song were released on Static & Ben El's official YouTube channel. Later, it is noticed in Daddy Yankee & Nicky Jam's hit single Muevelo.

Commercial usage 
The song was featured in the debut Peacock TV commercial by NBC, titled 'Timeless Classics'. The commercial was first aired on May 11, 2020. The song was also sampled in Akull's song Gadbadi.

Track listing

Charts

See also
List of Billboard number-one Latin songs of 2020

References

External links
 Static & Ben El, Pitbull - Further Up (Na, Na, Na, Na, Na) (Official Video)

2020 singles
Dance-pop songs
English-language Israeli songs
Pitbull (rapper) songs
Songs written by Pitbull (rapper)
Songs written by Salaam Remi
Songs written by Chris Kenner
Number-one singles in Israel